Ilham Rio Fahmi (born 6 October 2001) is an Indonesian professional footballer who plays as a full-back for Liga 1 club Persija Jakarta and the Indonesia national under-23 team.

Club career

Persija Jakarta
He was signed for Persija Jakarta to play in Liga 1 in the 2021 season. Fahmi made his first-team debut on 12 September 2021 as a substitute in a match against PSIS Semarang at the Indomilk Arena, Tangerang.

International career
Rio was part of the Indonesia under-23 team that won bronze at the 2021 Southeast Asian Games in Vietnam.

Career statistics

Club

Notes

Honours

International 
Indonesia U-23
 Southeast Asian Games  Bronze medal: 2021

References

External links
 Ilham Rio Fahmi at Soccerway
 Ilham Rio Fahmi at Liga Indonesia

2001 births
Living people
Indonesian footballers
Liga 1 (Indonesia) players
Persija Jakarta players
Association football defenders
Sportspeople from Central Java
Indonesia youth international footballers
Competitors at the 2021 Southeast Asian Games
Southeast Asian Games bronze medalists for Indonesia
Southeast Asian Games medalists in football